The Third Inauguration of Gurbanguly Berdimuhamedov as the President of Turkmenistan took place on Friday, 17 February 2017 inside the halls of the Ruhyýet Palace, in Ashgabat, Turkmenistan. It marked the commencement of the third seven-year term of Gurbanguly Berdimuhamedov. He secured a third term in office by winning 97.69 percent of the vote in the national elections that took place on  February 12, 2017.

Official Ceremony

First Part 
The State Flag of Turkmenistan, the Presidential Standard, the Constitution of Turkmenistan and the Quran were carried into the hall by the soldiers of the Independent Honor Guard Battalion of the Ministry of Defence to the sounds of marching music. Then, Berdimuhamedov was invited to the podium to take the oath of office.

Final Part 
The inauguration ceremony ended with the president's assumption as Supreme Commander in Chief of the Armed Forces. Berdimuhamedov left the palace to receive the guard of honour at the Oguzkhan Presidential Palace.  After receiving the report from the commander of the guard of honour, the National anthem of Turkmenistan was played, and a 21-gun salute sounded. The troops of the Armed Forces then took the National oath of Turkmenistan. The inaugural military parade then took place on Galkynysh Square near the presidential palace. After reviewing the parade, Berdimuhamedov, proceeded to the palace to assume his duties as head of state.

Congratulations from Foreign Leaders 
The president was congratulated by foreign leaders such as President of Russia Vladimir Putin.

References

External links 
 Footage of the Ceremony

Berdimuhamedov
Events in Turkmenistan
2017 in Turkmenistan